The men's 100 metre backstroke competition at the 2006 Pan Pacific Swimming Championships took place on August 17 at the Saanich Commonwealth Place.  The last champion was Aaron Peirsol of US.

This race consisted of two lengths of the pool, all in backstroke.

Records
Prior to this competition, the existing world and Pan Pacific records were as follows:

Results
All times are in minutes and seconds.

Heats
The first round was held on August 17, at 10:47.

B Final 
The B final was held on August 17, at 19:24.

A Final 
The A final was held on August 17, at 19:24.

References

2006 Pan Pacific Swimming Championships